The expression Morumbi may refer to:

 Morumbi, São Paulo, district of the city of São Paulo, SP
 Estádio do Morumbi, stadium in São Paulo, Brazil. Home of São Paulo Futebol Clube.
 Morumbi (Uberlândia), neighborhood of the city of Uberlândia, MG
 São Paulo–Morumbi, a metro station under construction